Zürn is a German surname. Notable people with the surname include:

Erich Zürn (1906–1965), German U-boat engineer during World War II
Georg Zürn (1834–1884), mayor of Würzburg, Germany
Unica Zürn (1916–1970), German author and painter
Walter Zürn (born 1937), German physicist and seismologist

See also
Zurn Peak, mountain in Antarctica named after Walter Zürn

German-language surnames